Manfred Mann Chapter Three were a British experimental jazz rock band founded by South African keyboard player Manfred Mann and long-time partner Mike Hugg, both former members of the group Manfred Mann. The line-up for its debut at Newcastle's Mayfair Ballroom on 24 October 1969 was: Mike Hugg (vocals/electric piano), Mann (organ), Bernie Living (alto sax), Steve York (bass) and Craig Collinge (drums), augmented by a five-piece brass section of Clive Stevens (tenor sax), Carl Griffiths (tenor sax), Dave Coxhill (baritone sax), Gerald Drewett (trombone) and Sonny Corbett (trumpet).

The band released two studio albums, and shelved a third. Mann went on to form Manfred Mann's Earth Band in 1971.

Albums

References

External links

Musical groups established in 1969
Vertigo Records artists